Les Kennedy may refer to

Les Kennedy (golfer), American golfer, in the 1950 Masters Tournament

Les Kennedy (journalist) (1958–2011), Australian journalist